The Second Battle of Pyramid Lake (also known as the Battle of Truckee River) took place in response to the U.S. defeat at the First Battle of Pyramid Lake.  A well-organized force of militia and regulars, under the capable leadership of famed Texas Ranger Col. John C. "Jack" Hays, defeated the Paiute warriors under Chief Numaga.  This was the final engagement of the Pyramid Lake War of 1860.

Background

On May 6, 1860, a band of Paiutes raided Williams Station along the Carson River, near present-day Silver Springs, Nevada, killing three white settlers at the station.  In response, Major William Ormsby led a group of vigilantes from Carson City and Virginia City against the Paiutes near Pyramid Lake.  The vigilante force was ingloriously defeated and Ormsby was killed.  This defeat prompted local settlers to send a call for help to nearby California.

Prelude
Colonel John C. Hays responded to the call and traveled to Carson City to organize a regiment of 500 volunteers, whom he dubbed the "Washoe Regiment".  Another 165 volunteers came from the nearby California communities of Placerville, Sacramento, Nevada City and Downieville.  Hays then marched his regiment to Virginia City.

The U.S. Army also responded to the call.  Captain Joseph Stewart left Fort Alcatraz with 144 Regulars from the 3rd U.S. Artillery and 6th U.S. Infantry regiments.  Stewart arrived in Carson City to await further developments.  In the meantime, Hays had marched out of Virginia City to Williams Station, where he skirmished with 150 Paiutes before the warriors pulled back to Pyramid Lake.

The Paiutes returned to their village at Pyramid Lake near the mouth of the Truckee River. They sent their women and children into the Black Rock Desert as a protective measure.

Battle

Colonel Hays retraced Ormsby's path along the Truckee River and encamped near present-day Wadsworth.  There, Captain Stewart joined the volunteers with Colonel Hays in overall command.

On June 2, the battle began when Hays sent out an advance party of two companies, while the main force moved eight miles downriver from their camp, much more cautiously than Ormsby had before.  The advance party, moving toward the Paiute village, encountered the remains of Ormsby's command on the previous battlefield that remained unburied. The Paiutes then made a rapid advance upon the soldiers in the shape of a wedge.  The advance party made a hasty withdrawal.

Colonel Hays selected an ideal location to make a stand.  It was a narrow canyon, about a mile wide, anchored to the west by steep mountains of the Virginia Range.  To the east ran the Truckee River.  Both geographical features prevented any flanking maneuver by the natives.  A rocky butte lay in the center of the field.  To the west of this butte, rain had cut lateral gullies into the sandy ground, providing natural breastworks, which either side could have used to make successive stands in the case he was forced to retreat.

The Paiute charge had taken possession of the butte and now extended their own line from the river well into the rocks of the mountains to the west.  The Paiutes had advanced so quickly that all geographical features advantageous to the fight were now in their hands.  The soldiers were forced to deploy on level ground to the south.  Captain Stewart deployed his regulars in a skirmish line to the west of the butte along the base of the mountains, while the volunteers formed to the east along the river.

Captain Edward Farris Storey and Captain J. B. Van Hagan, commanding two companies of volunteers from Virginia City and California, respectively, decided to make a charge against the butte even before Hays got the entire main force in place.  Storey and Van Hagan succeeded in seizing the butte and for a short time were subjected to flanking fire as the natives began to surround them from the river bank and mountain slopes.  This forward position was relieved as Hays advanced the main body forward.  Stewart drove the warriors from the mountain slopes while Hays and the volunteers steadily advanced along the river.  Eventually, the two sides maintained a continuous line of battle opposing each other roughly a mile long.

The battle continued for some time, with neither side gaining a clear advantage.  After fighting for nearly three hours, the Paiutes finally retreated up the canyon toward the lake.

On June 4, Captain Stewart took up pursuit of the natives coming upon the abandoned village at the mouth of the Truckee River.  Colonel Hays followed Stewart northward in pursuit.  On June 5, Hays sent a group of scouts through a canyon northeast of Pyramid Lake.  These scouts were ambushed and Private William Allen was killed.  He was the last casualty of the war.

Aftermath

Shortly after Allen's death, Colonel Hays returned with the Washoe Regiment to Carson City, where he disbanded the regiment.  Major Ormsby's body was temporarily interred where it lay near Pyramid Lake, but was later moved to a cemetery in Carson City.  Captain Storey, who was mortally wounded in the battle, was buried in Virginia City.  Both Ormsby and Storey had Nevada counties named after them.

Captain Stewart stayed in the Pyramid Lake area for a few more weeks, but the Paiutes never returned.  His soldiers eventually built several earthen forts around the lake.  Stewart abandoned these forts in favor of a larger fort along the Carson River.  Stewart began construction in 1861 and named the post Fort Churchill.

Battlefield
The battle site is located within the Pyramid Lake Indian Reservation.  Except for Nevada State Route 447 and a former railroad, the landscape is relatively the same as it was in 1860.  Nevada Historical Marker #148 is located near the intersection of S.R. 447 and Chicken Road on what would have been the north end of the battlefield.  The marker, titled "The Two Battles of Pyramid Lake", describes both battles.

References

1860 in the United States
Battles involving Native Americans
Conflicts in 1860
Native American history of Nevada
Paiute War
Pre-statehood history of Nevada
1860 in Utah Territory
June 1860 events
Battles in Nevada